The 14th Goya Awards were presented at L'Auditori in Barcelona, Spain on 29 January 2000. It was the first Goya awards ceremony to have taken place outside of Madrid.

All About My Mother won the award for Best Film.

Winners and nominees

Major award nominees

Other award nominees

Honorary Goya
 Antonio Isasi-Isasmendi

References

14
1999 film awards
1999 in Spanish cinema